Dushmian (also Romanized as Dūshmīān and Dūsh-e Mīān) is a village in Qalkhani Rural District, Gahvareh District, Dalahu County, Kermanshah Province, Iran. At the 2006 census, its population was 660, in 123 families.

References 

Populated places in Dalahu County